Côte d’Argent is a name given to part of the Atlantic coast of the Aquitaine region in France.

Etymology
The term was first coined to describe the Aquitaine coast in 1905 by the journalist and poet Maurice Martin. The Congrès national des sociétés de géographie officially approved the name in 1907. The region it referred to eventually shrunk; the northern part including Royan became the Côte de Beauté and the southern part including Anglet became the Basque Coast.

Geography
In the south-west of France, facing the Atlantic Ocean, La Côte d’Argent is part of the Bay of Biscay. It is limited at its north by the Gironde mouth and at its south by the river Adour. Large waves make this a popular surfing destination and create some of the largest sand dunes in Europe, including the Dune of Pilat. Surfing competitions include the Quiksilver Pro France and the Lacanau Pro.

Towns

Towns and resorts along the Côte d’Argent include:

Gironde
 Soulac-sur-Mer
 Vendays-Montalivet
 Hourtin 
 Carcans 
 Lacanau
 Le Porge
 Lège-Cap-Ferret 
 Arcachon
 Pyla-sur-Mer

Landes
 Biscarrosse 
 Mimizan, nicknamed the "Pearl of the Côte d’Argent"
 Contis
 Lit-et-Mixe
 Vielle-Saint-Girons
 Moliets-et-Maa
 Messanges
 Vieux-Boucau-les-Bains
 Seignosse
 Soorts-Hossegor 
 Capbreton
 Labenne
 Ondres
 Tarnos

Pyrénées-Atlantiques
 Anglet

See also
 Arcachon Bay
 The Great Dune of Pyla

References

Argent
Landforms of Gironde
Landforms of Landes (department)
Landforms of Pyrénées-Atlantiques
Seaside resorts in France
Surfing locations in France